Janet Kozyra is a heliophysicist who works on solar superstorms. She has used data from Imager for Magnetopause to Aurora Global Exploration (IMAGE), to show that Earth interacts with solar energy during solar storms.

Education and career 
Kozyra earned a B.S. (1979), an M.S. (1981), and a Ph.D. (1986) from the University of Michigan. Following her Ph.D. she joined the faculty at the University of Michigan as an assistant research scientist. In 2005, Kozyra was named the George Carignan Collegiate Research Professor. In 2014, Kozyra retired from her position at the University of Michigan. As of 2020, Kozyra is at the National Aeronautic and Space Administration (NASA).

Selected publications

Awards and honors 
 Fellow, American Geophysical Union (2005)

References 

Fellows of the American Geophysical Union
University of Michigan alumni
Space scientists
Year of birth missing (living people)
Living people